St Patrick's P.S. is an all-boys senior primary school in Tuam, County Galway, Ireland. It is situated on the Dublin Road. The school can trace its history back to 1816 but only became St. Patrick's in 1989. It is a senior boys' primary school and is very closely linked with neighbouring sister schools, Mercy and Presentation primary schools.

Notable alumni

 Davy Carton, musician
 Mike Cooley, trade unionist
 Ja Fallon, Gaelic footballer
 Rory Gaffney, soccer player
 Colm Keaveney, former T.D. 
 Finian McGrath, T.D.
 Leo Moran, musician
 Tom Murphy, playwright
 Brendan Murray singer
 Seán Purcell, Gaelic footballer 
 Frank Stockwell, Gaelic footballer

References

Boys' schools in the Republic of Ireland
Education in County Galway
Tuam